Two ships of the Royal Fleet Auxiliary have borne the name RFA Oakol:

  was an  tanker launched in 1917 and sold into civilian service in 1920 under the name Orthis.
  was an  coastal tanker launched in 1946, decommissioned in 1965 and scrapped in 1969.

Royal Fleet Auxiliary ship names